Dorinel Oancea (born 2 April 1997) is a Romanian footballer who plays as a defender for Liga I club Universitatea Cluj.

Honours
SCM Pitești
Liga III: 2016–17

References

External links

1997 births
Living people
Sportspeople from Câmpulung
Romanian footballers
Association football defenders
Liga I players
Liga II players
Liga III players
FC Argeș Pitești players
CS Mioveni players
FC Universitatea Cluj players